Leba Chand Tudu; is an Indian Communist politician. In August 1969, he was included in the Bengal-Bihar-Orissa Border Regional Committee of the Communist Party of India (Marxist-Leninist). As of 1970 he was the Gopibhallavpur Area Committee secretary of CPI(ML). He emerged as a leader of tribal communities in Jhargram district, and struggled for promotion of Santhali language. Tudu was released from jail in 1977. He contested the Nayagram Assembly constituency seat in the 1977 West Bengal Legislative Assembly election. He finishing in third place with 7,071 votes (17.49%). He stood as a candidate in the Jhargram constituency in the 1980 Indian general election, finishing in third place with 29,338 votes (5.97%).

After the division of Communist Party of India (Marxist-Leninist), he led the State Organising Committee, Communist Party of India (Marxist–Leninist) as its general secretary between 1979 and 2021. On 8 November 2021, SOC, CPI(ML) merged on the CPI(ML) Liberation. After the party merged, he became a member of the West Bengal State Committee member of CPI(ML) Liberation.

References

Communist Party of India (Marxist–Leninist) Liberation politicians
Living people
Politicians from Jhargram
1949 births